Christian Matras may refer to:

 Christian Matras (poet) (1900–1988), Faroe Islands poet
 Christian Matras (cinematographer) (1903–1977), French cinematographer